Dosmatic U.S.A., Inc. (also known as Dosmatic) is a Texas-based company which manufactures dosing pumps, fertigators, medicators and chemical injectors.

Dosmatic U.S.A. International, Inc. was founded in 1981 by Frank Walton as a small sales company for chemical injectors. Since then, Dosmatic became the leading manufacturer of non-electric, fluid-driven proportional injection technology. Dosmatic has been the provider to OEMs, distributors and service centers throughout the world.

Dosmatic manufactured injectors and pumps for the following market applications: animal health, bio-decontamination, diesel fuel additives, firefighting and fire prevention, food processing, golf course management, horticulture, pest control, printing, vehicle wash, waste-water treatment and other specialty applications.

Dosmatic grew from its headquarters in Carrollton, to offices in France, Belgium, Thailand, Japan, Australia and Argentina. The company exported products to over 70 countries worldwide. Additionally, Dosmatic had a worldwide network of over 500 distributors and regional service centers.

In 2011, Dosmatic was purchased by Hydro Systems Co. Inc. a division of Dover Corporation. Hydro is the world's largest independent manufacturer of chemical injecting, proportioning, dispensing equipment serving the janitorial, institutional, food service, commercial cleaning, industrial, automotive care markets, animal health and water treatment markets.

References

External links
 Dosmatic U.S.A., Inc. website
 Hydro Systems Co. website

1981 establishments in Texas
Chemical companies established in 1981
Chemical companies of the United States
Companies based in Carrollton, Texas
Medical technology companies of the United States
Technology companies established in 1981
Technology companies of the United States